Zeitler is a surname. Notable people with the surname include:

Charles Zeitler (August 1871 – 1903), American football player from South Bend, Indiana
Günter Zeitler, German handballer, who competed for the SC Dynamo Berlin/Sportvereinigung (SV) Dynamo
Kevin Zeitler, American football player
William Zeitler (born 1954), one of the world's leading virtuoso performers on the armonica, or glass harmonica
Yehoshua Zettler (1917–2009), (last name also spelled as Zeitler), the Jerusalem commander of Jewish paramilitary group Lehi